Yon González Luna (born 20 May 1986) is a Spanish actor. He is probably best known for his performance as Iván Noiret León in the Antena 3 series The Boarding School (El internado), as well as for his role of Julio Olmedo/Espinosa in the television series Gran Hotel and for that of Francisco Gómez in the Netflix series Cable Girls.

Acting career 
Yon González began his acting career in the LaSexta series SMS in 2006. He then went on to star in the Antena 3 series The Boarding School (El internado) from 2007 to 2010 which brought him wider popularity. González's performance as Iván Noiret León earned him an ACE Award for Best New Actor in 2010, as well as a Golden Nymph for Best Actor – Drama nomination at the Monte-Carlo Television Festival 2009.

Throughout 2008 and 2009, González starred in the motion pictures Sex, Party and Lies (Mentiras y gordas), opposite Mario Casas, Hugo Silva and his The Boarding School co–star Ana de Armas, and Sebastián Cordero's  (Rabia). He also appeared in the short films The Storymaker (El forjador de historias), Impossible Loves (Amores imposibles), Identity (Identidad) and Latex Puppets (Muñecos de latex), winning the La FILA Festival of Short Films Award for Best Male Performance for the latter. In 2011, González worked primarily in television, appearing in Gran Reserva, which stars his brother Aitor Luna, The Whos (Los Quién) and Gran Hotel (Gran hotel). Gran Hotel, in which he starred opposite his SMS fellow Amaia Salamanca, won him the Fotogramas de Plata Award for Best Television Actor.

During the 2015-2016 he starred in two seasons drama series, Bajo sospecha as the main protagonist, Víctor. The crime drama series are aired on AtresMedia's Atres Player. In that year, he also starred in a thriller movie together with his brother, Aitor Luna in Killing Time (Matar El Tiempo) with the role as Boris.

In 2017-2020 he played the role as Francisco Gómez on Netflix original series, Cable Girls. 

The other filming he made was Hil Kanpaiak, a Basque-language movie where he played the role as Iñigo Kortazar, a policeman. The movie has been aired on Festival du Cinéma Espagnol de Nantes 2021. He is also the main protagonist on Heirs to the Land as Hugo Llor. The series—based on a historical novel written by Ildefonso Falcones—aired on Netflix in April of 2022.

Other work 
In 2007, González modeled for David Delfín at the Cibeles Madrid Fashion Week. He also covered numerous magazines, such as Vanity Fair, Glamour, Marie Claire and Cosmopolitan, either alone or with his The Boarding School fellows.

In 2007, along with Martiño Rivas and Marta Torné, González supported the ONG Childhood Without Limits Foundation.

In 2020, he worked on promoting Dolce & Gabbana's latest perfume, K and campaigned it on his Instagram account.

Personal and media life 
González was born in Bergara, Gipuzkoa, and lives in Madrid. His older brother Aitor González Luna is also an actor, probably best known for his role in Los hombres de Paco and Enemigo íntimo. He cites Juan Diego, Jordi Mollà and Luis Tosar as his role models. 

In 2011, he was ranked sixth in 20 minutos list of sexiest Spanish actors.

He is represented by Paloma Juanes entertainment and actor agency.

Filmography

Awards and nominations

References

External links 
 

1986 births
Male actors from the Basque Country (autonomous community)
Living people
People from Bergara
Spanish male film actors
Spanish male models
Spanish male stage actors
Spanish male television actors
21st-century Spanish male actors
Basque-language actors